Ismail bin Daut (12 April 1956 – 4 June 2022) was a Malaysian lecturer and politician. He was the Member of the Parliament of Malaysia for the seat of Merbok, for one term from 2013 to 2018 representing the United Malays National Organisation (UMNO), a major component party in the Malaysia's former governing Barisan Nasional (BN) coalition.

A lecturer by profession, Ismail entered Parliament at the 2013 general election. The seat had been held by Rashid Din of the opposition People's Justice Party (PKR), although PKR's candidate for the 2013 election was Nor Azrina Surip. Ismail defeated her by 4,122 votes, returning the seat to the Barisan Nasional. The Election Court dismissed a petition filed by Nor Azrina challenging the result.

Ismail did not contest to defend his Merbok parliamentary seat in the 2018 general election.

Election results

Death
Ismail Daut accidentally fell down at his home and died.

References

 
1956 births
2022 deaths
People from Kedah
Malaysian people of Malay descent
Malaysian Muslims
United Malays National Organisation politicians
Members of the Dewan Rakyat
21st-century Malaysian politicians